Harmostini is a tribe of scentless plant bugs in the family Rhopalidae. There are at least two genera and about eight described species in Harmostini.

Genera
These two genera belong to the tribe Harmostini:
 Aufeius Stål, 1870 i c g b
 Harmostes Burmeister, 1835 i c g b
Data sources: i = ITIS, c = Catalogue of Life, g = GBIF, b = Bugguide.net

References

Further reading

External links

 

Rhopalinae